Samson (Soso) Pruidze (born 6 October 1957 in Kutaisi) is a retired Georgian and Soviet football player and later Georgian manager.

Player

Soso Pruidze spent an uneventful season at Dinamo Tbilisi at a time when the club was experiencing the change of generations following the Cup Winner's 1981 Cup glory. Then followed five seasons in Torpedo Kutaisi as a right defender, including in the Soviet Top League.

Coach

Pruidze has been in charge of different clubs, but become mostly known for a long-time manager at the helm of Chikhura Sachkhere. Apart from these twelve years being record-breaking in Georgian league history, Pruidze guided the team to national Cup and Super Cup titles, and also to the silver medals.   

In April 2021 Soso Pruidze was appointed as head coach of Samgurali, where he had started his coaching career in 1994.

Honours

Manager
Chikhura Sachkhere
 Erovnuli Liga

Runners-up (1), 2016

Georgian Cup 

Winners (1): 2017

Georgian Super Cup 

Winners (1): 2013

References

External links
On Soccerway

  Footballfacts Profile

1957 births
Soviet footballers
Footballers from Georgia (country)
Association football defenders
FC Dinamo Tbilisi players
FC Torpedo Kutaisi players
Soviet Top League players
Living people
Sportspeople from Kutaisi